Ringside seat may refer to:

 ringside seating (combat sports), see ringside (boxing)
 Ringside Seat, a 1983 videogame
 A Ringside Seat, a 2000 book by Michael Brunson
 "Ringside Seat", a 2015 TV episode of The First 48; see List of The First 48 episodes
 Ringside Seat, a newsletter established by Count Grog

See also

 Ringside (disambiguation)
 Seat (disambiguation)